Nicotinamide mononucleotide adenylyltransferase 1 (NMNAT1) is an enzyme that in humans is encoded by the nmnat1 gene. It is a member of the nicotinamide-nucleotide adenylyltransferases (NMNATs) which  catalyze nicotinamide adenine dinucleotide (NAD) synthesis.

Function 

The coenzyme NAD and its derivatives are involved in hundreds of metabolic redox reactions and are utilized in protein ADP-ribosylation, histone deacetylation, and in some Ca2+ signaling pathways. NMNAT (EC 2.7.7.1) is a central enzyme in NAD biosynthesis, catalyzing the condensation of nicotinamide mononucleotide (NMN) or nicotinic acid mononucleotide (NaMN) with the AMP moiety of ATP to form NAD or NaAD.

NMNAT1 is the most widely expressed of three orthologous genes with nicotinamide-nucleotide adenylyltransferase (NMNAT) activity. Genetically engineered mice lacking NMNAT1 die during early embryogenesis, indicating a critical role of this gene in organismal viability. In contrast, mice lacking NMNAT2, which is expressed predominantly in neural tissues, complete development but die shortly after birth. However, NMNAT1 is dispensable for cell viability, as homozygous deletion of this gene occurs in glioblastoma tumors and cell lines. Other tumors such as osteosarcoma, however, increase the expression of NMNAT1 upon exposure to DNA damaging agents and inactivation of the nmnat1 gene renders these cells more sensitive to chemotherapy with cisplatin. This latter effect involves lowered nuclear NAD levels in NMNAT1 knockout cells and impaired DNA damage sensing by the NAD-dependent DNA break responsive enzyme poly (ADP-ribose) polymerase-1 (PARP1). The dependence of osteosarcoma cells on NMNAT1-derived NAD for the PARP1-dependent DNA repair and survival is not restricted to cisplatin-treated cancer cells but has also been reported to occur in actinomycine D-treated tumor cell lines, as well. These data suggest that nuclear NAD synthesis by NMNAT1 may represent a therapeutic target in osteosarcoma and possibly in other tumors, as well.

NMNAT enzymatic activity is probably essential at the cellular level, as complete ablation of NMNAT activity in model organisms leads to cellular inviability.

NMNAT1 enhancement opposes the actions of SARM1 which would lead to axon degeneration, but this effect is not due to preventing SARM1 depletion of NAD+.

Clinical relevance
Mutations in this gene have been shown associated to the LCA9 form of the retinal degeneration pathology Leber's congenital amaurosis.

Aging
Aged mice show a significant reduction of NMNAT1 gene products in the liver (which is the main site of de novo synthesis of NAD+). All NMNAT  gene isoform products also decline with age in mice in kidneys, oocytes, and colons.

References

Further reading